Rodney D. Bennett is the former President of the University of Southern Mississippi. Bennett received his Bachelor of Science in Mass Communication, Master of Education, and Education Specialist degrees from Middle Tennessee State University and earned his Ed.D. from Tennessee State University in Educational Administration. Bennett served as Vice President for Student Affairs at the University of Georgia, and in 2013 Bennett was appointed the 10th President of the University of Southern Mississippi. Shortly after his appointment, the Hattiesburg campus of the University of Southern Mississippi was struck by an EF4 tornado, which did not involve any loss of life due to a students' break for Mardi Gras holiday. In 2017, William Carey University, also located in Hattiesburg, Mississippi, was struck by a tornado, and Bennett's leadership in providing temporary space at the University of Southern Mississippi later resulted in him being honored with a doctor of humane letters, honoris causa, from William Carey. He was inducted into Omicron Delta Kappa in 2019 at the University of Southern Mississippi.

Bennett is the first African-American president of a historically and predominantly white higher education institution in Mississippi.

References

External links
 Office of the President, University of Southern Mississippi

Living people
Middle Tennessee State University alumni
Tennessee State University alumni
University of Southern Mississippi faculty
1966 births